The Minister of State for Commonwealth Relations was a ministerial post in the Government of the United Kingdom from 1947 until 1966. The holder was responsible for assisting the Secretary of State for Commonwealth Relations in dealing with British relationships with members of the Commonwealth of Nations (its former colonies). 

After 1966 the post was merged with the Minister of State for the Colonies and became the Minister of State for Commonwealth Affairs.

Office Holders
1947: Arthur Henderson

Arthur Henderson held the post for less than two months before the position was abolished. It was then recreated in 1959.

1959: Cuthbert Alport
1962: The Duke of Devonshire
1964: Cledwyn Hughes (to 1966)

Lists of government ministers of the United Kingdom
History of the Commonwealth of Nations
Defunct ministerial offices in the United Kingdom
1947 establishments in the United Kingdom
1966 disestablishments in the United Kingdom